The Comédie-Française or Théâtre-Français is one of the few state theatres in France. Founded in 1680, it is the oldest active theatre company in the world. Established as a French state-controlled entity in 1995, it is the only state theatre in France to have its own permanent troupe of actors. The company's primary venue is the Salle Richelieu, which is a part of the Palais-Royal complex and located at 2, Rue de Richelieu on Place André-Malraux in the 1st arrondissement of Paris.

The theatre has also been known as the Théâtre de la République and popularly as "La Maison de Molière" (The House of Molière). It acquired the latter name from the troupe of the best-known playwright associated with the Comédie-Française, Molière. He was considered the patron of French actors. He died seven years before his troupe became known as the Comédie-Française, but the company continued to be known as "La Maison de Molière" even after the official change of name.

History
The Comédie-Française was founded on 8 August 1680 by a decree of Louis XIV merging the only two Parisian acting troupes of the time, the troupe of the Guénégaud Theatre and that of the Hôtel de Bourgogne. On the death of Molière in 1673, the troupe at the Guénégaud had been formed by a merger of the Théâtre du Marais and the Troupe de Molière. Two years later they received a royal grant of 12,000 livres per year; and seven years later they received their present designation. Thus the Comédie-Française may be said to have an unbroken tradition reaching back to the days of Molière.

The company gave its first performance on 25 August 1680 at the Guénégaud. Its leading actors included Molière's widow, Armande Béjart, her husband, Guérin d'Estriché, La Grange, Mlle Champmeslé, Baron, Hauteroche, and Raymond Poisson. The repertoire consisted of the collection of theatrical works by Molière and Jean Racine, along with a few works by Pierre Corneille, Paul Scarron and Jean Rotrou.

In the 18th century, the Comédie-Française was often enjoyed by the French nobility, since the price to watch at the theater was expensive.

On the performance of Joseph Chénier's anti-monarchical play Charles IX in 1789, violent political discussions arose among the performers, and ultimately they split into two sections: the Republican party, under the young tragedian Talma, establishing a new theatre under the name "Théâtre de la République," on the site of the present building in the Rue de Richelieu; while the Royalist section took the title "Théâtre de la Nation". On 3 September 1793, during the French Revolution, the Théâtre de la Nation was closed by order of the Committee of Public Safety for putting on the allegedly seditious play Pamela, and the actors were imprisoned though gradually released later. On 31 May 1799, the new government made the Salle Richelieu available and allowed the actors to reconstitute the troupe.

The Comédie-Française today has a repertoire of 3,000 works and three theatres in Paris (Salle Richelieu, next to the Palais Royal; théâtre du Vieux-Colombier; Studio-Théâtre).

COVID-19 pandemic
Since October 2020, and because of the COVID-19 pandemic, the Comédie-Française had to close as it is the case for all other theaters in France. The  Comédie-Française having a permanent troupe of actors, it was decided to switch temporarily to an online program, including readings of the full text of In Search of Lost Time, and an online initiative called Théâtre à la table where actors of the troupe play works in the repertoire after a one week rehearsal.

Online attendance for this initiative was unexpectedly high, including people outside of Paris and in other countries.

In May 2021 Éric Ruf, the managing director of the Comédie-Française, declared that 30% of the public of the online program never went to the Comédie-Française, and that they would continue this program even after the reopening.

Theatre buildings
The Comédie-Française has had several homes since its inception in 1680 in the Salle Guénégaud. In 1689, it was established in a theatre across from the Café Procope. From 1770 to 1782, the Comédie performed in the theatre in the royal palace of the Tuileries.  In 1782, the company moved into the Salle du Faubourg Saint-Germain, designed by architects Marie-Joseph Peyre and Charles De Wailly and located on the site of today's Odéon. Since 1799, the Comédie-Française has been housed in the Salle Richelieu (architect Victor Louis) at 2, rue de Richelieu. This theatre was enlarged and modified in the 1800s, then rebuilt in 1900 after a severe fire. The actress Jane Henriot was the only casualty of the fire.

Theatrical troupe

The membership of the theatrical troupe is divided into "sociétaires" and "pensionnaires". The former are regular members of the organisation and as such receive a pension after 20 years of service, while the latter are paid actors who may, after a certain length of service, become "sociétaires". The names of nearly all the great actors and dramatists of France have, at some time in their career, been associated with that of the Comédie-Française.

Administrators of the Comédie-Française

The chief administrator of the Comédie-Française has been given the title administrateur général since Simonis' term of 1850. Before that, a variety of titles were given.

See also 
 Troupe of the Comédie-Française in 1680
 Troupe of the Comédie-Française in 1752
 Troupe of the Comédie-Française in 1754
 Troupe of the Comédie-Française in 1755
 Troupe of the Comédie-Française in 1772
 Troupe of the Comédie-Française in 1790
 List of works by Henri Chapu. Bust of Alexandre Dumas Pere

Notes

Bibliography
 Brockett, Oscar G.; Hildy, Franklin J. (2008). History of the Theatre, tenth edition. Boston: Pearson. .
 Clarke, Jan (1998). The Guénégaud Theatre in Paris (1673–1680). Volume One: Founding, Design and Production. Lewiston, New York: The Edwin Mellen Press. .
 Gaines, James F. (2002). The Molière Encyclopedia. Westport, Connecticut: Greenwood Press. .
 Hartnoll, Phyllis, editor (1983). The Oxford Companion to the Theatre (fourth edition). Oxford: Oxford University Press. .
 Laugier, Eugène (1853). Documents historiques sur la Comédie-Française pendant le règne de S. M. l'Empereur Napoléon Ier. Paris: Firmin-Didot. Copies 1, 2, and 3 at Internet Archive.
 Maurice, Charles (1860). Le Théâtre-Français, monuments et dépendances, second edition, revised and enlarged. Paris: Garnier. Copies 1 and 2 at Internet Archive.
 Sanjuan, Agathe; Poirson, Martial (2018). Comédie-Française: une histoire du théâtre. Paris: Éditions du Seuil. .
 Trowbridge, Simon (2020). The Comédie-Française from Molière to Éric Ruf. Oxford: Englance Press. .
 Wild, Nicole (2012). Dictionnaire des théâtres parisiens (1807–1914). Lyon: Symétrie. . .

External links

 Comédie-Française's website
 The Comédie Française Registers Project includes performances from 1680 to 1791.

 
1680 establishments in France
Theatres in Paris
National theatres
Buildings and structures in the 1st arrondissement of Paris
Theatre companies in France
Opera history